Pygomeles is a genus of skinks, lizards in the family Scincidae. The genus is endemic to Madagascar.

Classification
There are three species that are recognized as being valid.
Pygomeles braconnieri  – Braconnier's short skink
Pygomeles petteri  – Petter's short skink
Pygomeles trivittatus

References

Further reading
Brygoo É-R (1984). "Systématique des lézards scincides de la région malgache. XIV. Le genre Pygomeles A. Grandidier 1867 ". Bulletin du Muséum d'Histoire Naturelle, Paris, Série quatrième [Fourth Series], Section A, 6: 769–777. (in French).
Glaw F, Vences M (2006). A Field Guide to the Amphibians and Reptiles of Madagascar, Third Edition. Cologne, Germany: Vences & Glaw Verlag. 496 pp. .
Grandidier A (1866). "Liste des reptiles nouveaux découverts, en 1866, sur la côte sud-ouest de Madagascar ". Revue et magasin de zoologie pure et appliquée et de sériciculture comparée, Series 2, 19: 232–234. (Pygomeles, new genus, p. 234; P. braconnieri, new species, p. 234). (in French and Latin).

 
Reptiles of Madagascar
Endemic fauna of Madagascar
Lizard genera
Taxa named by Alfred Grandidier